Ruzian (also Romanized as Rūzīān; also known as Rūznīyān) is a village in Rahmat Rural District, Seyyedan District, Marvdasht County, Fars Province, Iran. At the 2006 census, its population was 475, in 100 families.

References 

Populated places in Marvdasht County